The 2012 Tour de Borneo, a cycling stage race that took place in Malaysia. It was held from 27 April to 1 May 2012. There were five stages, covering 755.8 kilometres. In fact, the race was sanctioned by the Union Cycliste Internationale as a 2.2 category race and was part of the 2011–12 UCI Asia Tour calendar.

Michael Torckler of New Zealand won the race, followed by Nathan Earle of Australia second and Jonathan Lovelock of Australia third overall. Out of 102 riders, a total 72 riders made it to the finish in Kota Kinabalu.

Stages

Final standings

General classification

Stage results

Stage 1
27 April 2012 — Semporna to Tawau,

Stage 2
28 April 2012 — Tawau to Lahad Datu,

Stage 3
29 April 2012 — Lahad Datu to Sandakan,

Stage 4
30 April 2012 — Sepilok to Kundasang,

Stage 5
1 May 2012 — Kundasang to Kota Kinabalu,

External links
 Palmares at cyclingarchives.com
 Results at cqranking.com

2012 in road cycling
International sports competitions hosted by Malaysia
2012 in Malaysian sport